Rahmat Shah Sail ( - born 1950, writer) is a prominent Pakistani poet in the Pashto language, belongs to the Utmankhel tribe.

Early life
Rahmat Shah Sail is the son of Amin Gul and Khana Bibi  belongs to the Paindakhel tribe. Sail was born in the Dargai village of Wartier in Malakand Agency, Pakistan. At the age of five, Sail was admitted to a local primary school; however, he was compelled to leave school after the third grade to assist his parents in earning a living. He was very interested in reading magazines and newspapers, and after a hard day of labour, he composed poetry to lessen his fatigue.

Academic life
Sail is the author of several poetry books in the Pashto language:

Published books:
 
 
 
 
 
 
 
 
 
 
 

Work
Sail spent most of his life working as a tailor in Dargari Bazar. He is currently the chief editor of Pashtun Magazine published by Bacha Khan Centre.

References

Pashto-language poets
Pashtun people
1943 births
Living people
Pakistani poets